Dandeli Wildlife Sanctuary is located at  in Uttara Kannada District of Karnataka  state in India.

Along with neighboring Anshi National Park, the sanctuary was declared part of the Anshi Dandeli Tiger Reserve in 2006. Karnataka state government has officially notified the Dandeli Elephant Reserve under Project Elephant on 4 June 2015. The elephant reserve is spread over 2,321 km2, including 475 km2 as core and the remaining as buffer areas. This is the second elephant reserve in Karnataka after Mysuru Elephant Reserve, which was declared in 2002.

Dandeli Wildlife Sanctuary is a birdwatchers paradise, housing nearly 200 species of birds, most famous for the great hornbill (great Indian hornbill or great pied hornbill) and the Malabar pied hornbill. It is also the only known tiger reserve in India to report frequent sightings of the elusive black panther. It is also known to house the Indian sloth bear, the Indian pangolin, the giant Malabar squirrel, dhole, the Indian jackal and the muntjac (barking deer). Sightings of the Indian elephant and the Indian peafowl are pretty common. The king cobra and the mugger crocodile (Indian crocodile) are the prime reptilians in Dandeli Wildlife Sanctuary.

The forests in Dandeli are a mixture of dense deciduous trees interspersed with bamboo and teak plantations. The sanctuary is rich in flora and fauna. Crocodiles are major wildlife attraction in this sanctuary. It offers a unique experience of bird watching and crocodile spotting. You can walk through the forest or enjoy bird watching. There are a variety of reptilian and amphibian species in and around the wildlife sanctuary.

See also
 Dandeli National Park Flora

References

North Western Ghats montane rain forests
Wildlife sanctuaries of the Western Ghats
Tiger reserves of India
Wildlife sanctuaries in Karnataka
Tourist attractions in Uttara Kannada district
2006 establishments in Karnataka
Protected areas established in 2006